Rescue 995 is a 20-episode drama serial which debuted on Singapore's free-to-air Chinese language channel, MediaCorp TV Channel 8 in February 2012. It stars Jeanette Aw, Tay Ping Hui, Pierre Png, Yvonne Lim & Ng Hui as the casts of this series. It revolves around the medical industry and the life of paramedics.

This drama is sponsored by the Singapore Civil Defence Force, which has the real fire and ambulance vehicles and procedures.

There are no nominations for this drama for Star Awards 2013.

The theme song for Rescue 995 was sung and performed by Lorraine Tan in 2010 which the album is also known as 我的世界 (My World).

Synopsis

Some people say that the ambulance paramedic's job is the toughest in having to deal with accident victims or critically ill patients. Paramedics do not draw attention to themselves but carry out their work in quiet efficiency, always at the frontline of life-saving work to re-ignite the light of life for those on the brink of death. The serial explores the lives of several paramedics on the home front and in the work place as they go about their jobs.

In the course of saving a pregnant woman and a young man suffering from head injuries, Shi Haoran (Jeanette Aw) and Xu Wenqian (Yvonne Lim) realised that it is their first day of work with the ambulance team. Haoran's father Shi Xinguo (Zhu Houren) is a cardiac specialist who wants his daughter to study medicine. Their relationship is strained when she chooses to be a paramedic instead. Caught in the crossfire is Zhong Lingfeng (Hong Huifang), Haoran's mother and a TCM practitioner. Haoran does not desire acknowledgements or accolades from her achievements but rejoices over the lives she saves. Armed with a wealth of knowledge in both Western and traditional Chinese medicine, she inevitably oversteps the boundary of a paramedic...

Cast

Characters

 Jeanette Aw as Shi Haoran  Aw plays Shi Haoran, a righteous and kind-hearted paramedic. Born to parents who are doctors, she defies her father’s wish for her to study medicine by becoming a paramedic instead, thus straining her relationship with her father. Influenced by her parents, Haoran has a strong sense of justice and responsibility and often goes beyond her duty as a paramedic during the course of her work. Initially not impressed by senior paramedic Huang Yixun’s work attitude, her opinion of him changes after seeing his genuine passion for his job.
 Tay Ping Hui as Huang Yixun  Senior paramedic Huang Yixun is a happy-go-lucky and humorous guy who strangely strikes the lottery whenever he manages to save lives. His carefree attitude towards relationships changes when he witnesses a colleague’s demise in the line of duty and subsequently begins to treasure the people around him.
 Yvonne Lim as Xu Wenqian  Wenqian was involved in an accident when she was young and after she witnessed how paramedics worked tirelessly to save her life, she decides to become a paramedic when she grows up. Like Haoran, she is determined not to give up on any patient without a fight. Romantically involved with Shi Zeming, their relationship is rocked with Wenqian’s family problems.
 Pierre Png as Shi Zeming  Shi Zeming, Haoran’s brother, is a doctor at the A & E department in his hospital. He knows he is inferior to Haoran in his father’s eyes so he works even harder to prove himself. He falls in love with Wenqian but her family problems lead to constant quarrels and misunderstandings between them.
 Ng Hui as Cai Jieyi  Ng portrayed a caring and loving nurse but looks unapproachable and harsh with her words at times. She does not admit defeat easily due to her pride. She also constantly nags about everything, which makes her seem like a mother. She suspects that something has happened to Meiying, and starts to keep a distance from Youhua but she eventually plucks up the courage to help him.
 Huang Wenyong as Ke Dashan  Ke is a senior experienced paramedic who loves to play pranks on rookie paramedics. Though he likes to take advantage of his seniority, he is a serious mentor to newcomers. He also cares a lot for his wife Alice and enjoys the meals she cooks.
 Ben Yeo as Nimo  Firefighter Nana's boyfriend, Nimo is weak, timid, lacks vigour, afraid of blood, but is very persistent in relationships. He can't draw the line between work and personal matters.
 Zhu Houren as Shi Xinguo  Shi is Lingfeng's husband and Zeming and Haoran's father. Dead serious and a perfectionist, he always thinks that his views are right. The way he treats his children and patients is the same - for all to follow his instructions, and thus it is difficult for him to be open to advice from others. At times, he makes people feel that he's too rational and too cold.
 Hong Huifang as Zhong Lingfeng  Lingfeng is Xinguo's wife and Zeming and Haoran's mother. She doesn't show her weaknesses or vulnerability in front of others. She keeps all her thoughts and worries to herself causing her to become ill because of stress and overwork. She seems the healthiest but yet falls ill.
 Li Qiyang as Peng Youhua  Youhua is Meiying's husband and Jiajian's father. He is mature and stable, reserved, dedicated and self-sacrificial. In front of his son, he reveals his playful side, for instance pretending to be pitiful so that his son will eat his dinner. Sometimes he misses opportunities due to his cautious side, causing him to be disappointed.
 Jacqueline Chow as Yan Meiying  Meiying is a good wife to Youhua and a loving mother to Jiajian. Kind and sisterly, she takes good care of the younger generation. She will rather be at a disadvantage than argue with others.

Episodes

Overseas broadcast

References

Singapore Chinese dramas
2012 Singaporean television series debuts
Singaporean medical television series
Channel 8 (Singapore) original programming